Ion Creangă is a commune in Neamț County, Western Moldavia, Romania. It was named after the Romanian writer Ion Creangă. The commune is composed of six villages: Averești, Ion Creangă (Brătești until 1908 and then Brăteanu until the advent of the Communist regime in 1948), Izvoru, Muncelu, Recea, and Stejaru.

References

Communes in Neamț County
Localities in Western Moldavia